Andrew Stewart Herron (October 27, 1823 – November 27, 1882) was an American lawyer, politician, and military officer.

Born in Nashville, Tennessee, Herron was a banker and lawyer in Baton Rouge, Louisiana. He served as Secretary of State of Louisiana from 1852 to 1859. Herron served as a delegate to the Louisiana Secession Convention and then in the Confederate Army where he served as a military judge in Mobile, Alabama. In 1865, Herron was elected Louisiana Attorney General. Herron was in elected to the United States House of Representatives in 1882 and died on November 27, 1882, in Baton Rouge, Louisiana, before he took the oath of office.

See also
List of members-elect of the United States House of Representatives who never took their seats

Notes

|-

|-

1823 births
1882 deaths
19th-century American businesspeople
19th-century American politicians
Businesspeople from Louisiana
Elected officials who died without taking their seats
Louisiana Attorneys General
People of Louisiana in the American Civil War
Politicians from Baton Rouge, Louisiana
Politicians from Nashville, Tennessee
Secretaries of State of Louisiana